The Laws of Thermodynamics is a 2018 Spanish comedy film directed and written by Mateo Gil. The film is a romantic comedy, but is presented partially as a documentary with protagonist "physics geek" Manel attempting to explain the characters behaviour and emotion using the laws.

Cast 
 Vito Sanz as Manel
 Berta Vázquez as Elena
 Chino Darín as Pablo
 Vicky Luengo as Eva
 Irene Escolar as Raquel
 Josep Maria Pou as Profesor Amat
 Andrea Ros as Alba
 Daniel Sánchez Arévalo as Daniel Sánchez Arévalo
 Alicia Medina as Modelo Anuncio
 Marta Aguilar as Chica Orgullo
 José Javier Domínguez as Camarero
 Txell Aixendri as Enfermera
 Carlos Olalla as Psicólogo

Production 
The Laws of Thermodynamics was produced by Zeta Cinema, Atresmedia Cine, and On Cinema 2017 and it had the participation of Netflix, Televisió de Catalunya, Atresmedia, ICAA and ICEC.

Release
Distributed by Sony Pictures Entertainment Iberia, it was theatrically released in Spain on April 20, 2018. It was released on August 31, 2018 on Netflix streaming in certain regions.

Critical reception 
The film has received mixed reviews, and holds a 46% approval rating on Rotten Tomatoes, and a score of 45 on Metacritic. Critics tended to praise its original concept, but criticized the characterization and romantic plotting as shallow, with the LA Times complaining that "Gil’s overly clever notion wears out its welcome" and "Manel and Elena are wispily drawn characters with predictable arcs". Variety was more positive, calling it a "fizzing, restless, wholly singular fusion of physics lecture and romcom" stating also that "The love story and the academic treatise gradually impinge on each other more than they inform each other". The Hollywood Reporter likewise stated "Though it is intermittently witty, visually playful and laudable in its attempt to appeal to both head and heart, Laws abandons its characters to its big concept".

See also 
 List of Spanish films of 2018

References

External links 
 
 
 

2018 films
2018 comedy films
Spanish comedy films
2010s Spanish-language films
Zeta Studios films
Atresmedia Cine films
2010s Spanish films